Henrik Harboe (1784–1848) was a Norwegian civil servant and government official.  He served as the County Governor of Nedenæs county from 1837 until 1848.

Harboe received his Cand.jur. degree in 1803. Later that same year he was an auditor in the Norwegian Artillery Brigade, with the title Chief Auditor. In 1814 he was appointed to be the bailiff in Buskerud, and on 19 April 1837 he became County Governor for Nedenæs amt.

The parents were Colonel Jacob Harboe (1736–1824) and Cecilia Marie Meyer. He married Danish-born Julie Gertrude Mourier (1790–1840) in 1810. Her father was Ferdinand Louis Mourier, a Swiss professor and priest. Henrik and Cecilia lived in Arendal during his time as governor.  They had 7 children including Edvard Henrich Waldemar Harboe (1815–1894) and Lorentz Julius Torvald Harboe (1828–1867).

References

1784 births
1848 deaths
County governors of Norway